Whipcracking is the act of producing a cracking sound through the use of a whip. Used during livestock driving and horse riding, it has also become an art. A rhythmic whipcracking  belongs to the traditional culture among various Germanic peoples of Bavaria (Goaßlschnalzen), various Alpine areas (Aperschnalzen), Austria, and Hungary (Ostorozás).  Today it is a performing art, a part of rodeo show in United States, a competitive sport in Australia and increasingly popular in the United Kingdom, where it crosses boundaries of sport, hobby and performance.

Physics
The crack a whip makes is produced when a section of the whip moves faster than the speed of sound creating a small sonic boom. The creation of the sonic boom was confirmed in 1958  by analyzing the high-speed shadow photography taken in 1927.

Recently, an additional, purely geometrical factor was recognized: the tip of the whip moves twice as fast at the loop of the whip, just like the top of a car's wheel moves twice as fast as the car itself.

A common explanation is to derive the behavior from the conservation of energy law. However it was noted that the energy is also conserved when the crack sizzles, therefore derivations from purely conservation laws, including conservation of momentum and some others are insufficient.

Based on simulations, the high speed of the tip of the whip has been proposed to be a result of a "chain reaction of levers and blocks".

In 1997, Discover Magazine reported about the possibility of the "whipcracking" effect millions of years ago. As part of the joint computer scientists' and paleontologists' research into the motion of dinosaurs, Nathan Myhrvold, a chief technology officer from Microsoft, carried out a computer simulation of an Apatosaurus, which had a very long, tapering tail resembling a whip. Basing on the reasoning described above, Myhrvold concluded that sauropods were capable of producing a crack comparable to the sound of a cannon. However, in 2022 a more sophisticated model revealed that while some diplodocid dinosaurs could possibly have used their tails as whips, they wouldn't have been able to break the sound barrier. At that speed the caudal vertebrae of the sauropods at the posterior end would simply break.

Shows and competitions

Goaßlschnalzen
Goaßlschnalzen, Goaßlschnalzn, Goasslschnoizen is translated as "whip-cracking", from the Bavarian word Goaßl (German: Geißel) for coachwhip. In earlier centuries, the carriage drivers used elaborate crack sequences to signal their approach and to identify them. Over time horse-drawn transport dwindled, but the tradition remained, and coaches practiced their skill in their spare time.

Today the Goaßlschnalzer ("whipsnappers") do concert performances, often as bands that include conventional musical instruments. Whipsnapping is also a traditional sport in Bavaria. There are many whip-cracking associations in Bavaria.

Aperschnalzen
Aperschnalzen or Apaschnoizn in Bavarian is an old tradition of competitive whipcracking revived in the first half of the 20th century. The word "aper" means "area free of snow", and it has been thought that this tradition had a pagan meaning of "driving the winter away" by whipcracking.

British Whipcracking Convention

The British Whipcracking Convention is a place for all who are interested in whip cracking. This ranges from complete novices who have never picked up a whip, through intermediate skills to expert skill sharing. There are workshops for the differing skill levels as well as competitions and targets. The third convention was  held in Aldersley Leisure Village, Aldersley Road, Wolverhampton on 14 July 2007.

Australian sport
In the latter half of the 20th century, attempts to preserve traditional crafts, along with a resurgence of interest in Western performance arts and the release of films such as Raiders of the Lost Ark (in which the hero, Indiana Jones, uses a bullwhip as a tool), led to an increased interest in whipcracking as a hobby and performance art, as well as a competitive sport.  Whip cracking competitions have become especially popular in Australia. They focus on the completion of complex, multiple-cracking routines and precise target work. Various whips, apart from bullwhips, are used in such competitions.  The most common whip used in Australian competitions is an Australian stockwhip, a whip unique to Australia.
Target routines
target cutting
object wrapping
object moving/manipulation
Cracking routines
Cracking patterns
Cracking with two whips
In cracking routines, the judging criteria are the presentation and making audible cracks in prescribed moments.

North America 
Whipcracking is also a popular sport and hobby in North America, especially in the United States of America. Since the mid 2000's, whipcracking performances have become increasingly prevalent at renaissance fairs, rodeos, cruise ships, and many other venues. Whipcracking competitions are also popular in North America, and a World Championship has been held annually in Los Angeles, California since 2017. The competitions at this event have ranged over the years, and can include speed, accuracy, and general whip proficiency. The "world champion" title is usually awarded based on a combined scoring from the single whip freestyle and double whip freestyle sections.

See also

Bullwhip
Crack the Whip
John Brady, an expert whipcracker
Fiona (Wilks) Smith, 12 times Australian ladies champion in whipcracking
Stockwhip
Whip boxing
Indiana Jones

References

Further reading
 Andrew Conway, The New Bullwhip Book, Loompanics Unlimited, 2005. .
 Robert Dante, Let's Get Cracking! The How-To Book of Bullwhip Skills, CreateSpace, 2008. .
 Why Whips Crack

External links
The art of whipcracking
  Aperschnalzen
The Whip Artistry Studio - Non-combative Whip Arts
Bullwhip.org
Brophy Family Whips and lasso artists that have been touring the world for over 30 years
Canada Whips A resource for whipcrackers worldwide

Displacement free aerophones
Whip arts
Rodeo-affiliated events